Mycroft may refer to:

Fictional entities
 Mycroft Holmes, Sherlock Holmes' brother in Arthur Conan Doyle's detective novels
 Mycroft Holmes (novel), a 2015 novel by Kareem Abdul-Jabbar and Anna Waterhouse
 Mycroft Holmes, a computer in Robert A. Heinlein's 1966 novel The Moon Is a Harsh Mistress
 Mycroft Mixeudeim, main character in the play The Charge of the Expormidable Moose by Claude Gauvreau

Computing
 Mycroft project, a collection of search plugins for web browsers
 Mycroft (software), an open source intelligent personal assistant inspired by Robert A. Heinlein's 1966 novel The Moon Is a Harsh Mistress

People
 Alan Mycroft, co-creator of the Norcroft C compiler
 Frank Mycroft (1873–1900), an English cricketer who played for Derbyshire between 1893 and 1895
 Michaela Mycroft (born 1994), South African activist
 Thomas Mycroft (1848–1911), English cricketer
 William Mycroft (1841–1894), English cricketer
 Ian Gillies (1927–2002), question setter and arbiter of the BBC Radio 4 quiz series Brain of Britain

See also
 Mycroft Next, a character from Jasper Fforde's Thursday Next series of books
 Mycroft & Moran, an imprint of Arkham House publishers